Gainsbourg Confidentiel is the fifth studio album by French musician Serge Gainsbourg, released in 1964. It features a minimalistic approach to jazz, with only a double bass and an electric guitar.

Track listing

Personnel
Credits adapted from liner notes.

 Serge Gainsbourg – vocals
 Michel Gaudry – double bass
 Elek Bacsik – electric guitar
Technical
Nicolas Treatt - photography

References

External links 
 
 

1964 albums
Serge Gainsbourg albums
French-language albums
Philips Records albums